Lupematasila Bob Gasio (born February 8, 1966), known as Bob Gasio, is a boxer from Samoa. He competed in the 1994 Commonwealth Games where he won a silver medal for boxing in the Men's Light-Middleweight class. He competed in the 1996 Summer Olympics in the Men's Middleweight class.

Professional boxing record

References

External links
 

1966 births
Living people
Samoan male boxers
Light-middleweight boxers
Olympic boxers of Samoa
Boxers at the 1996 Summer Olympics
Commonwealth Games silver medallists for Samoa
Commonwealth Games medallists in boxing
Boxers at the 1994 Commonwealth Games
Medallists at the 1994 Commonwealth Games